Events in the year 2002 in Mexico.

Incumbents

Federal government
 President: Vicente Fox 

 Interior Secretary (SEGOB): Santiago Creel
 Secretary of Foreign Affairs (SRE): Jorge Castañeda Gutman
 Communications Secretary (SCT): Pedro Cerisola
 Education Secretary (SEP): Reyes Tamez
 Secretary of Defense (SEDENA): Gerardo Clemente Vega
 Secretary of Navy (SEMAR): Marco Antonio Peyrot González
 Secretary of Labor and Social Welfare (STPS): José Carlos María Abascal Carranza
 Secretary of Welfare (SEDESOL): Josefina Vázquez Mota
 Tourism Secretary (SECTUR): Leticia Navarro
 Secretary of the Environment (SEMARNAT): Víctor Lichtinger
 Secretary of Health (SALUD): Julio Frenk
Attorney General of Mexico (PRG): Rafael Macedo de la Concha

Supreme Court

 President of the Supreme Court: Genaro David Góngora Pimentel

Governors

 Aguascalientes: Felipe González González 
 Baja California: Eugenio Elorduy Walther 
Baja California Sur: Leonel Cota Montaño,  
 Campeche: José Antonio González Curi
 Chiapas: Pablo Salazar Mendiguchía 
 Chihuahua: Patricio Martínez García 
 Coahuila: Enrique Martínez y Martínez 
 Colima: Fernando Moreno Peña 
 Durango: Ángel Sergio Guerrero Mier 
 Guanajuato: Juan Carlos Romero Hicks 
 Guerrero: René Juárez Cisneros 
 Hidalgo: Manuel Ángel Núñez Soto 
 Jalisco: Alberto Cárdenas 
 State of Mexico: Arturo Montiel 
 Michoacán
Víctor Manuel Tinoco Rubí  (date not available)
Lázaro Cárdenas Batel  (date not available)
 Morelos: Sergio Estrada Cajigal Ramírez .
 Nayarit: Antonio Echevarría Domínguez
 Nuevo León: Fernando Canales Clariond 
 Oaxaca: José Murat Casab 
 Puebla: Melquíades Morales 
 Querétaro: Ignacio Loyola Vera 
 Quintana Roo: Joaquín Hendricks Díaz 
 San Luis Potosí: Fernando Silva Nieto
 Sinaloa: Juan S. Millán 
 Sonora: Armando López Nogales 
 Tabasco: Manuel Andrade Díaz , starting January 1
 Tamaulipas: Tomás Yarrington 	
 Tlaxcala: Alfonso Sánchez Anaya 
 Veracruz: Miguel Alemán Velasco 
 Yucatán: Víctor Cervera Pacheco 
 Zacatecas: Ricardo Monreal 

Head of Government of the Federal District: Andrés Manuel López Obrador

Events

 January 23 – La Espuela Coal Mine disaster caused the death of 13 miners
 February 28 – The El Heraldo de Mexico Awards took place.
 March 18 – The Monterrey Consensus from the International Conference on Financing for Development begins in Nuevo Leon. 
 September 20 – Hurricane Isidore (category 3) reaches the Yucatán Peninsula
 October 25 – Hurricane Kenna (category 5) reaches Puerto Vallarta
 October 30 – Banco Azteca begins operations
 November 10 – The ITU World Triathlon Series take place in Cancún.

Awards	

	
Belisario Domínguez Medal of Honor	– Héctor Fix Zamudio
Order of the Aztec Eagle	
National Prize for Arts and Sciences	
National Public Administration Prize	
Ohtli Award
 Rosa Ramirez Guerrero
 Richard Joel Noriega

Popular culture

 March 3 – Beginning of the reality show Big Brother
 May 15 – The Los Premios MTV Latinoamérica 2002 take place in Mexico City
 June 30 – The reality show La Academia begins.
 July 4 – The TV y Novelas Awards take place in Mexico City.

Sports 
 Primera División de México Verano 2002
 Primera División de México Apertura 2002

Music

Film

Documentaries
 Gabriel Orozco
 Niños de la calle
 Los últimos zapatistas, héroes olvidados
  Acosada (De piel de víbora)

Fiction
 Amar te duele
 Aro Tolbukhin. En la mente del asesino
 Dark Cites (Ciudades oscuras)
 El crimen del padre Amaro
 eXXXorcismos
 Francisca (... De qué lado estás?)
 El gavilán de la sierra
 La habitación azul
 Seres humanos
 El tigre de Santa Julia
 Una de dos
 La virgen de la lujuria

Literature

TV

Notable deaths
 January 3 – Juan García Esquivel (84), musician
 February 10 – Ramón Arellano Félix (37), drug lord
 April 8 – María Félix, 88, Mexican actress (b. April 8, 1914)
 October 11 – Emilio García Riera, 70, actor, writer and cinema critic (b. 1931)
 October 19 – Manuel Alvarez Bravo (100), photographer
 November 6 – Alfonso Martínez Domínguez (80), politician
 November 21 – Arturo Guzmán Decena
 December 2 – Ivan Illich, Austrian Catholic priest and philosopher who co-founded the Centro Intercultural de Documentación in Cuernavaca (b. 1926).

References

 
Mexico
2000s in Mexico
Mexico
Years of the 21st century in Mexico